The Midwestern State Mustangs (also MSU Texas Mustangs) are the athletic teams that represent Midwestern State University, located in Wichita Falls, Texas, in NCAA Division II intercollegiate sports. The Mustangs compete as members of the Lone Star Conference for 13 varsity sports.

In 2017, Charlie Carr retired, replaced by athletic director, Kyle Williams.

Varsity sports

List of teams

Men's sports
 Basketball
 Football
 Golf
 Soccer
 Tennis

Women's sports
 Basketball
 Cross Country
 Golf
 Soccer
 Softball
 Tennis
 Track & Field
 Volleyball

References

External links